Glenwood is a town in northeastern Newfoundland, Newfoundland and Labrador, Canada. It is in Division No. 6 on Gander Lake.

Demographics 

See also
 List of cities and towns in Newfoundland and Labrador

References

Towns in Newfoundland and Labrador